BLVD Place is a mixed-use development located in Uptown Houston, Houston, Texas, United States, encompassing 20 acres at the intersection of Post Oak Boulevard and San Felipe.

BLVD Place is home to Whole Foods Market and numerous upscale shops, boutiques, and restaurants. Phase I, including  of retail and office space, was completed in 2009.

In May 2012, Energy company Apache Corporation, currently headquartered nearby at Post Oak Central, acquired  in BLVD Place for their Houston headquarters.

The bank will consolidate its Houston region headquarters into the new space.

In April 2017, the real estate investment trust, Whitestone REIT, announced plans to buy the development for, along with Eldorado Plaza, $204.6 million. The eventually acquired the development for $158 million.

See also 
 Architecture of Houston

References

Buildings and structures in Houston
Buildings and structures under construction in the United States
Proposed skyscrapers in the United States